The 17th Filmfare Awards South Ceremony honoring the winners of the best of South Indian cinema in 1969 was an event held in April 19, 1970 at Shanmukhananda hall in Bombay along with Hindi Awards.

The Kannada films are added in this year. The president of this year's function was the minister of state information and broadcasting I. K. Gujral. The chief guest of the evening was Satyajit Ray.

Jury

Awards

Awards presentation

 M. G. Ramachandran (Best Film Tamil) Received Award from I. K. Gujral
 Harini (Best Film Kannada) Received Award from Achala Sachdev
 P. Joseph (Best Film Malayalam) Received Award from Raakhee

References

 Filmfare Magazine April 10, 1970.
 Filmfare Magazine May 8, 1970.

General

External links
 
 

Filmfare Awards South